Edward Cahill may refer to:

 Edward Cahill (judge) (1843–1922), justice of the Michigan Supreme Court in 1890
 Edward Cahill (priest) (1868–1941), Irish Jesuit priest and academic
 Edward Cahill (pianist) (1885–1975), Australian concert pianist
 Edward F. Cahill, American football and basketball coach
 Ted Cahill (Australian footballer) (1902–1968), Australian rules footballer in the 1920s
 Ted Cahill (rugby league), English rugby league footballer of the 1950s